Estrella is an administrative neighborhood of Madrid belonging to the district of Retiro.

As of 1 March 2020, it has a population of 23,474.

References 

Wards of Madrid
Retiro (Madrid)